is a Japanese manga series by Mari Ozawa serialized in Kiss from 1993 to 1999. It won the 19th Kodansha Manga Award for shōjo manga and it was adapted into a 2-episode live-action television drama in 1996.

Characters

Volumes

References

1993 manga
1996 Japanese television series debuts
1996 Japanese television series endings
Japanese television dramas based on manga
Kodansha manga
Shōjo manga
Winner of Kodansha Manga Award (Shōjo)